Cone Peak is the second highest mountain in the Santa Lucia Range in the Ventana Wilderness of the Los Padres National Forest. It rises  nearly a vertical mile only  from the coast as the crow flies. This is one of the steepest gradients from ocean to summit in the contiguous United States. The average gradient from sea level to summit is around 33%, which is steeper than the average gradient from Owens Valley to the summit of Mount Whitney. Near the mountain summit, the oak woodland and chaparral transitions to a pine forest with a few rare Santa Lucia Firs.

The peak is accessible by driving the Nacimiento-Fergusson Road and then turning north  on Forest Route 22S05. The peak is a popular hiking destination. From that point the summit is  hike along the Cone Peak Trail (4E12). There are two trails from the coast to the summit of Cone Peak: via the Stone Ridge/Gamboa Trail or the Vicente Flat Trail.

The peak is topped by the decommissioned Cone Peak Lookout built in 1923. The original  wooden-sided ground-level cab house was built on a rock foundation. It originally had a hipped "dunce cap" roof, and was called a "California Lookout" design. The building was hauled in pieces by mules up the steep and narrow  trail. During World War II, it was the site of an Aircraft Warning Service observation post.

In 1959. the U.S. Forest Service replaced the hipped roof with a flat roof that could be used to land a Bell-47 helicopter. The wood siding was replaced with metal which protected the structure from fire and vandalism. The lookout was last staffed in 1990. , the building houses radio repeater equipment and cannot be easily reactivated for use as a fire tower once again.

The lookout atop Cone Peak was one of six active fire lookouts in the Monterey Ranger District of the Los Padres National Forest. The others were located on Chews Ridge, Ventana Double Cone, Junipero Serra Peak,  Pinyon Peak, and Three Peaks.

The mountain slopes contain an old-growth Sugar pine (Pinus lambertiana) forest along with many colonies of Santa Lucia fir (Bristlecone fir, Abies bracteata), one of the rarest and most endemic fir in North America,  and according to some, the world. Cone Peak was visited by notable botanists David Douglas in March 1831, Thomas Coulter in 1832 or 1833, Karl Theodor Hartweg in September 1847, and William Lobb in 1849.

See also 

 Mountain peaks of California

References

External links 

 
 

Mountains of Monterey County, California
Santa Lucia Range
Monterey Ranger District, Los Padres National Forest
Mountains of Northern California
Big Sur
Fire lookout towers